The Lynn News is published by Iliffe Media and appears each Tuesday and Friday in King's Lynn, Norfolk, England.

It was previously owned by Johnston Press, but in January 2017 it was bought by Iliffe Media, along with 12 other titles for £17m. Since then it has been printed in Cambridge.

References

External links
 Newspaper website

Publications with year of establishment missing
Newspapers published in Norfolk
King's Lynn